Laenna Township is located in Logan County, Illinois. As of the 2010 census, its population was 584 and it contained 282 housing units.

Geography

The township includes the geographical center of the State of Illinois, a small monument to which has been erected at 40°3.157'N 89°11.087'W (40.05259,-89.18482), in a park southeast of Melvin Street and East Olive Street in the village of Chestnut.

Demographics

References

External links
US Census
City-data.com
Illinois State Archives

Townships in Logan County, Illinois
Townships in Illinois